Michael Gerard Davey (born June 2, 1952) is an American former professional baseball player, a former middle relief pitcher in Major League Baseball who played from  through  for the Atlanta Braves. A native of Spokane, Washington, he attended Gonzaga University, where he played college baseball for the Bulldogs from 1972 to 1974.
 
In 19 relief appearances, Davey posted a 4.34 ERA with two saves and did not have a decision, giving up nine runs on 20 hits and 10 walks while striking out seven in  innings of work.

Davey pitched in the Atlanta, Seattle and Pittsburgh minor league systems for the Richmond (1978), Spokane (1979) and Portland teams (1980). In 137 games, he collected an 8–7 record with a 3.83 ERA and 19 saves.

See also
 1977 Atlanta Braves season
 1978 Atlanta Braves season
 Atlanta Braves all-time roster

References

External links
, or Retrosheet, or Venezuelan Winter League

1952 births
Living people
Atlanta Braves players
Baseball players from Spokane, Washington
Gonzaga Bulldogs baseball players
Gonzaga University alumni
Greenwood Braves players
Kingsport Braves players
Major League Baseball pitchers
Portland Beavers players
Richmond Braves players
Savannah Braves players
Spokane Indians players
Tiburones de La Guaira players
American expatriate baseball players in Venezuela
Spokane Falls Bigfoot baseball players